Tanzania has the second largest economy in the East African Community and the tenth largest in Africa. It is largely dependent on agriculture for employment, accounting for about half of the employed workforce. An estimated 34 percent of Tanzanians currently live in poverty. The economy has been transitioning from a command economy to a market economy since 1985. Although total GDP has increased since these reforms began, GDP per capita dropped sharply at first, and only exceeded the pre-transition figure in around 2007.

Notable firms 
This list includes notable companies with primary headquarters located in the country. The industry and sector follow the Industry Classification Benchmark framework. Organizations which have ceased operations are included and noted as defunct.

See also
 List of banks in Tanzania
 The Tanzania Chamber of Commerce, Industry and Agriculture

References

Companies of Tanzania
Economy of Tanzania
Tanzania